Amaury II (d. 1089) was the fourth lord of Montfort l'Amaury, a castle in the territory that eventually became modern-day France.

He was the son of Simon I, Lord of Montfort, and Isabel de Broyes.

He succeeded his father and died soon after. He, in turn, was succeeded by his half brother Richard de Montfort.

Bibliography 
 

1089 deaths
House of Montfort
Seigneur of Montfort
Year of birth unknown